Borisovka is a rural locality (a selo) in Volokonovsky District, Belgorod Oblast, Russia. The population was 673 as of 2010. There are 5 streets.

Geography 
Borisovka is located 28 km southwest of Volokonovka (the district's administrative centre) by road. Kiselev is the nearest rural locality.

References 

Rural localities in Volokonovsky District